Acacia leucolobia is a shrub of the genus Acacia and the subgenus Phyllodineae that is endemic to eastern Australia.

Description

Distribution
It is native to an area of New South Wales from around Coolah in the north down to around Katoomba in the south and from around Bowral to Wingello as a part of open Eucalyptus woodland communities.

Taxonomy and naming
It was first described in 1830 by Robert Sweet. The specific epithet, leucolobia, is an adjective describing the plant as "white-podded".

See also
 List of Acacia species

References

leucolobia
Flora of New South Wales
Plants described in 1830
Taxa named by Robert Sweet (botanist)